Kenan Hadžić (born 7 May 1994) is a Croatian footballer of Bosniak origin who currently plays for SV Gronau.

Club career
Hadžić started training football at his local club in Vodnjan before moving on to the NK Istra 1961 academy in 2006 for the first time. He signed his first contract for the club at the beginning of 2013, before being loaned out to NK Rovinj, where he played at the same time for the third-tier senior and the second-tier U19 team.

Returning to Istra 1961 in the summer of 2013, he made his first-team debut in the 3-1 away loss vs. GNK Dinamo Zagreb on August 31, 2013. He was, however, loaned out for a further season at NK Rovinj. During the 2014/15 season, he captained Istra 1961's reserve team.

Hadžić scored his first goal for NK Istra 1961 in the 1-0 home win against NK Slaven Belupo on September 8, 2017, ensuring his club's first win of the season. In January 2018 he left Istra. 

On 22 January 2018, Hadžić signed with Premier League of Bosnia and Herzegovina club FK Željezničar Sarajevo. In May 2018, he won the 2017–18 Bosnian Cup with Željezničar. On 18 June 2018, Hadžić left Željezničar.

On 31 January 2019, Hadžić moved to Luxembourg and joined FC Swift Hesperange in the Luxembourg Division of Honour. He later played in the German amateur leagues.

Honours

Player

Club
Željezničar Sarajevo 
Bosnian Cup: 2017–18

References

External links

1994 births
Living people
Sportspeople from Pula 
Bosniaks of Croatia
Association football defenders
Croatian footballers
NK Istra 1961 players
NK Rovinj players
FK Željezničar Sarajevo players
FC Swift Hesperange players
Croatian Football League players
Premier League of Bosnia and Herzegovina players
Luxembourg Division of Honour players
Croatian expatriate footballers
Expatriate footballers in Bosnia and Herzegovina
Croatian expatriate sportspeople in Bosnia and Herzegovina
Expatriate footballers in Luxembourg
Croatian expatriate sportspeople in Luxembourg
Expatriate footballers in Germany
Croatian expatriate sportspeople in Germany